Paul Weigel (18 February 1867 – 25 May 1951) was a German-American actor. He appeared in more than 110 films between 1916 and 1945.

Selected filmography

 Naked Hearts (1916) - Cecil's Father
 Each Pearl a Tear (1916) - Roger Winston
 The Intrigue (1916) - Attaché to the Baron
 Witchcraft (1916) - Makepeace Struble
 Each to His Kind (1917) - Asa Judd
 The Black Wolf (1917) - Old Luis
 The Winning of Sally Temple (1917) - Talbot
 The Bond Between (1917) - Carl Riminoss
 The Inner Shrine (1917) - Minor Role
 Forbidden Paths (1917) - Luis Valdez
 Pride and the Man (1917) - George Everett
 The Claim (1918) - Mike Bryan
 The Only Road (1918) - Manuel Lopez
 Her Body in Bond (1918) - Emmett Gibson
 Me und Gott (1918) - The Kaiser
 The Parisian Tigress (1919) - Count de Suchet (the elder)
 The Siren's Song (1919) - Hector Remey
 Happiness a la Mode (1919) - Attorney Logan
 Evangeline (1919) - Father Felician
 Luck in Pawn (1919) - William Rainier
 A Master Stroke (1920) - Hodge
 Under Crimson Skies (1920) - Plum Duff Hargis
 The Red Lane (1920) - Father Leclair
 The Breath of the Gods (1920) - Count Ronsard
 Merely Mary Ann (1920) - Vicar
 Kismet (1920) - Afife
 They Shall Pay (1921) - Henry Seldon
 Bring Him In (1921) - Braganza
 Up and Going (1922) - Father Le Claire (in play)
 Bluebeard's 8th Wife (1923) - Marquis DeBriac
 Bag and Baggage (1923) - Philip Anthony
 Fighting for Justice (1924) - Sam Culvert
 Which Shall It Be? (1924) - Musicmaster
 Mademoiselle Midnight (1924) - Napoleon III (Prologue)
 The Fatal Mistake (1924)
 Honor Among Men (1924) - Baron Barrat
 Tainted Money (1924)
 The Silent Accuser (1924) - Stepfather
 The Folly of Vanity (1924) - Old Roué (fantasy sequence)
 Soft Shoes (1925) - Dummy O'Day
 Excuse Me (1925) - Rev. Job Wales
 Déclassée (1925) - Henri
 The Verdict (1925) - Butler
 Boys Will Be Joys (1925) - Sheik Rustum
 A Lover's Oath (1925) Sheik Rustum
 The Speed Limit (1926) - Mr. Charles Benson
 For Heaven's Sake (1926) - Brother Paul, The Optimist
 Blonde or Brunette (1927) - Butler
 Sinews of Steel (1927) - Jan Van Der Vetter
 The King of Kings (1927) - (uncredited)
 Hidden Aces (1927) - Serge Demidoff
 Broadway After Midnight (1927)
 The Wagon Show (1928) - Joey
 Marry the Girl (1928) - The Butler
 Skyscraper (1928) - Redhead's father
 Isle of Lost Men (1928) - Preacher Jason
 Code of the Air (1928) - Doc Carson
 The Tiger's Shadow (1928) - Martin Meeker
 Lady of the Pavements (1929) - Prussian Diplomat (uncredited)
 The Leatherneck (1929) - Petrovitch
 Viennese Nights (1930) - Man in Vienna Opera Box (uncredited)
 Mordprozeß Mary Dugan (1931) - Präsident Nash
 The Mask Falls (1931)
 Liebe auf Befehl (1931) - Dr. Munaterra
 The Vanishing Legion (1931) - Oil Co. Director Larribee
 The Miracle Woman (1931) - Florence's Father (uncredited)
 Bad Company (1931) - Meyer - the Tailor (uncredited)
 Soul of the Slums (1931) - Brother Jacob
 Broken Lullaby (1932) - Townsman (uncredited)
 Back Street (1932) - Adolph Schmidt - Ray's Father
 The Vampire Bat (1933) - Dr. Holdstadt (uncredited)
 Luxury Liner (1933) - Father with 20 Marks (uncredited)
 Topaze (1933) - Chestnut Vendor (uncredited)
 Neighbors' Wives (1933) - Otto
 After Tonight (1933) - Concessionaire (uncredited)
 The House of Rothschild (1934) - Man in 1780 Sequence (uncredited)
 Guilty Parents (1934) - Juror (uncredited)
 I'll Tell the World (1934) - Telegraph Operator (uncredited)
 All Men Are Enemies (1934) - Landlord (uncredited)
 The Black Cat (1934) - Stationmaster (uncredited)
 Lottery Lover (1935) - Eiffel Tower Attendant (uncredited)
 One More Spring (1935) - Minor Role (uncredited)
 The Black Room (1935) - A Peasant (uncredited)
 Condemned to Live (1935) - Old Village Doctor (uncredited)
 Just My Luck (1935) - Graves
 The Invisible Ray (1936) - Monsieur Noyer
 Lady of Secrets (1936) - Dr. Claudel (uncredited)
 The Story of Louis Pasteur (1936) - Minor Role (uncredited)
 Sutter's Gold (1936) - Townsman (uncredited)
 Dracula's Daughter (1936) - Transylvania Innkeeper (uncredited)
 Anthony Adverse (1936) - Butler (uncredited)
 Ladies in Love (1936) - Waiter (uncredited)
 Come Closer, Folks (1936) - Schlemmer (uncredited)
 Espionage (1937) - French Telegrapher (uncredited)
 Maytime (1937) - Prompter (uncredited)
 Thin Ice (1937) - (uncredited)
 The Gold Racket (1937) - Daniel Forbes, Assayer (uncredited)
 The Road Back (1937) - Member of Dinner Party (uncredited)
 Confession (1937) - Courtroom Reporter (uncredited)
 Lancer Spy (1937) - Schreiber, Hotel Manager (uncredited)
 Prescription for Romance (1937) - Peasant (uncredited)
 Little Tough Guy (1938) - Proprietor (uncredited)
 The Great Waltz (1938) - Organ Grinder (uncredited)
 Disbarred (1939) - Warehouse Watchman (uncredited)
 Never Say Die (1939) - Concierge (uncredited)
 Ninotchka (1939) - Vladimir - With Letter from Leon (uncredited)
 I Can't Give You Anything But Love, Baby (1940) - Piano Tuner (uncredited)
 Four Sons (1940) - Peasant (uncredited)
 The Great Dictator (1940) - Mr. Agar
 A Dispatch from Reuters (1940) - Professor Gauss (uncredited)
 I Wake Up Screaming (1941) - Gus-Delicatessen Proprietor (uncredited)
 Joan of Paris (1942) - Janitor
 Crossroads (1942) - Old Man (uncredited)
 Berlin Correspondent (1942) - Patron (uncredited)
 Miss V from Moscow (1942) - Henri Devallier
 Reunion in France (1942) - Old Man (uncredited)
 The Moon Is Down (1943) - Elderly Man (uncredited)
 Above Suspicion (1943) - Elderly Man (uncredited)
 Paris After Dark (1943) - News Dealer (uncredited)
 Happy Land (1943) - Pop Schmidt (uncredited)
 Passport to Destiny (1944) - Berlin Hotel Proprietor (uncredited)
 The Hitler Gang (1944) - Manservant (uncredited)
 The Hairy Ape (1944) - Doctor (uncredited)
 A Tree Grows in Brooklyn (1945) - Candy Store Proprietor (uncredited)
 Where Do We Go from Here? (1945) - Dutch Councilman (uncredited)
 Bewitched (1945) - The Governor's Butler (uncredited)

References

External links

1867 births
1951 deaths
American male film actors
American male silent film actors
German emigrants to the United States
People from Halle (Saale)
People from the Province of Saxony
20th-century American male actors